Araneus illaudatus, commonly called the Texas orb-weaver, is a species of spider belonging to the family Araneidae. It has a rather restricted range in western Texas and eastern Arizona.

The female is a very large, hairy orb-weaver, up to 25 mm in length (excluding legs). The overall color is a dirty white, sometimes with a pinkish tinge. A distinctive feature is the presence of two roughly triangular dark patches at the front of the abdomen, each with a small white spot within. The male is very much smaller, only reaching 9 mm in length.

References

 
  (2009): The world spider catalog, version 9.5. American Museum of Natural History.

illaudatus
Spiders of the United States
Spiders described in 1936
Taxa named by Willis J. Gertsch